

Events
January 1 – Syndicate casinos are seized by Fidel Castro government after Cuban dictator Fulgencio Batista flees the country following the Cuban Revolution. Suffering a major financial setback, Meyer Lansky returns to Miami, Florida and begins looking into the possible relocation of syndicate casinos in the Bahamas and Caribbean.
February 26 – New Jersey mobster Abner Zwillman is found dead in his home after apparently hanging himself with a plastic clothesline. An investigated ruled suicide as the cause of death as Zwillman was facing federal investigation into his coin-operated machine business and tax evasion.
April 17 – Vito Genovese, boss of the Genovese crime family is convicted of drug trafficking and is sentenced to 15 years. Vincent Gigante, Genovese's driver and bodyguard to 7 years and Bonanno Crime Family lieutenant Natale Joseph Evola is also imprisoned. Thomas Eboli, Jerry Catena, Michele Miranda, Anthony Strollo and Phil Lombardo are placed on a "committee" to run the Genovese crime family operations following Genovese's imprisonment. 
June 9 – During his appearance for questioning before the McClellan Committee, Chicago mobster Sam Giancana refuses to answer the questions while repeatedly citing the Fifth Amendment, often punctuating his responses with a terse chuckle, to which a clearly frustrated chief counsel Robert F. Kennedy retorts, "I thought only little girls giggled, Mr. Giancana."
September 25 – After being called away from a Lexington Avenue restaurant, Anthony Carfano and his companion, Janice Drake are found dead in an abandoned car in Queens. A police investigation ruled both had been shot in the back of the head, possibly by a gunman hidden in the back seat.
December 18 – Paul Castellano is convicted of obstructing a government investigation and sentenced to five years imprisonment, although he is released after seven months.

Births
November 14 – Vincent Basciano "Vinny Gorgeous", Bonanno crime family boss

Deaths
September 25 – Anthony Carfano "Little Augie Pisano", Genovese crime family underboss 
September 25 – Janice Drake, murder victim
November 4 – Frank Abbatemarco, Colombo crime family capo

References

Organized crime
Years in organized crime